Presidential elections were held in Egypt on 16 September 1976. The elections took the form of a referendum on the candidacy of Anwar El Sadat, who ran unopposed. He received 99.9% of the vote, with a turnout of 95.7%.

Results

References

Egypt
1976 in Egypt
Presidential elections in Egypt
Referendums in Egypt
Single-candidate elections